Dean Hudnutt (May 25, 1891 – October 11, 1943) was an American sports shooter.

Biography
Dean Hudnutt was born in Hanover, Michigan on May 25, 1891. He graduated from the United States Military Academy at West Point in 1916.

He competed in the 25 m pistol event at the 1936 Summer Olympics.

He died in New Haven, Connecticut on October 11, 1943, and was buried at West Point Cemetery.

References

1891 births
1943 deaths
American male sport shooters
Olympic shooters of the United States
Shooters at the 1936 Summer Olympics
People from Hanover, Michigan
Sportspeople from Michigan
United States Military Academy alumni
Burials at West Point Cemetery